The 2019/20 Oberliga season was the 61st season of the Oberliga, the third-tier of German ice hockey. The Oberliga operated with two regional leagues, North and South. 24 teams competed in the season that spanned from 28 September 2019 till 11 March 2020. The regular season and championship playoff qualifiers was completed, but the season was then cut short due to the COVID-19 pandemic and the remainder of the Oberliga season was cancelled by DEB. The championship playoffs were not contested so no Oberliga champion was named. There was also no sporting promotion or relegation, with ERC Sonthofen the only team to be relegated due to the club entering insolvency. Tilburg Trappers were crowned Oberliga North premiers, while Eisbären Regensburg were crowned Oberliga South premiers.

Teams

Three Regionalliga teams declined promotion to Oberliga North (ECW Sande, Herford EV and Schönheider Wolves). DEL team, Krefeld EV applied for a licence for their U23 team to compete in Oberliga North, this was accepted. EC Harzer Falken withdrew from the league after beginning insolvency proceedings. ECC Preussen Berlin had the chance to apply for a licence, even though they were relegated from the previous season but they could not meet the conditions so remained in Regionlliga Ost. 

Deggendorf SC joined Oberliga South for 2019/20 after being relegated from DEL2. EV Landshut left the league after being promoted to DEL2. EV Füssen joined the league from the Bayernliga while EHC Waldkraiburg went the other direction. The champions of Regionalliga Südwest, SC Bietigheim-Bissingen were not eligible for promotion to Oberliga South due to their first team playing in DEL2 (Bietigheim Steelers)

Oberliga North

Oberliga North ran from 21 September 2019 till 10 March 2020. The league operated with a 44 match (4 matches against each team) regular season. The top six teams automatically qualified for the championship & promotion playoffs. The next four teams advanced to the qualification playoffs for two spots in the championship playoffs. The team finishing eleventh, had their season end after the regular season while the team that finished twelfth, was relegated to the Regionalliga. Tilburg Trappers topped the league standings at the end of the regular season, being crowned Oberliga North premiers. Krefeld EV U23's finished last and would have been relegated until the league decided to suspend all promotion and relegation for the season due to COVID-19 ending the season early.

Regular season

Qualification playoffs

Teams finishing seventh to tenth play best of three match series in the qualification playoffs to determine the final two places from Oberliga North in the Championship playoffs. The matches occurred between 6 March and 10 March 2020.

Oberliga South

Oberliga South ran from 27 September 2019 till 8 March 2020. The league was broken into two stages. Stage one, the regular season, had all twelve teams compete in a home and away round before splitting into two regional groups for a second home and away round for a total of 32 matches. The top ten teams advanced to the Oberliga South qualification round to determine the league premier and eight qualifiers for the Oberliga championship playoffs. The bottom two teams advanced to the relegation playoffs with six Bayernliga teams. Memmingen Indians finished top of the regular season but Eisbären Regensburg topped the fifty match qualification round to claim the Oberliga South premiership. ERC Sonthofen Bulls and Höchstadter EC finished in the bottom two, but the relegation playoffs were cancelled due to COVID-19, so neither team was relegated on sporting performance. However, ERC Sonthofen declared bankruptcy and withdrew from the league, confirming their relegation next season.

Regular season

Qualification round

Championship playoffs

The championship playoffs to determine the Oberliga champion and promotion to DEL2 did not go ahead for the 2019/20 season. All ice hockey in Germany was cancelled on 11 March 2020 due to the COVID-19 pandemic.

Qualified teams

References

External links

 Official website
 Elite Prospects home

Oberliga (ice hockey) seasons
2019–20 in German ice hockey
Oberliga